The InfoAg Conferences are a source for information on technology in crop production, data management, and communication.  Sponsored by the Foundation for Agronomic Research (FAR) and the International Plant Nutrition Institute (IPNI), the InfoAg conferences feature a line-up of speakers, interest areas, and demonstrations.

Previous venues 
1995 - Champaign, IL - Chancellor Hotel, June 27-30, 1995
1996 - Champaign, IL - University of Illinois
1997 - Champaign, IL - University of Illinois
1999 - West Lafayette, IN - Purdue University, August 9-11, 1999
2001 - Indianapolis, IN -  InfoAg 2001, August 7-9
2003 - Indianapolis, IN -  InfoAg 2003, July 30-August 1
2005 - Springfield, IL -  InfoAg 2005, July 19-21
2007 - Springfield, IL -  InfoAg 2007, July 10-12
2009 - Springfield, IL -  InfoAg 2009, July 14-16
2011 - Springfield, IL -  InfoAg 2011, July 12-14
2013 - Springfield, IL -  InfoAg 2013, July 16-18
2014 - St. Louis, MO -  InfoAg 2014, July 29-31
2015 - St. Louis, MO -  InfoAg 2015, July 28-30
2016 - St. Louis, MO -  InfoAg 2016, August 2-4, 2016
2019 - St. Louis, MO -  InfoAg 2019, July 22-25, 2019

Forthcoming venues
2021 - St. Louis, MO -  InfoAg 2021, 27–29 July 2021 (no 2020 conference)

Regional Conferences
In 2005, the InfoAg Conferences began holding regional conferences focused on regional concerns, crops, and speakers.
Mid-South 2005 - Tunica, MS -  InfoAg Mid-South 2005
Mid-South 2007 - Starkville, MS -  InfoAg Mid-South 2007
Northwest 2007 - Kennewick, WA -  InfoAg Northwest 2007

Conferences in the United States
Agricultural shows in the United States
Agronomy